Alexei Collado Acosta (born 13 February 1988) is a Cuban professional boxer. As an amateur he won a gold medal in the flyweight division at the 2006 Junior World Championships.

Amateur career
In 2006 he won fights against Khalid Saeed Yafai and Luis Yanez in Agadir for the Junior World title. In 2007 and 2008 he lost at the senior national championships due to a loss to Andry Laffita.

Professional career
In 2008 he joined Ismaikel Pérez and Luis Garcia to turn professional at super bantamweight in Ireland.

References

External links

2006 World Juniors

1988 births
Living people
Cuban emigrants to Ireland
Boxers from Havana
Flyweight boxers
Cuban male boxers
21st-century Cuban people